The 1949 Manitoba general election was held on November 10, 1949, to elect Members of the Legislative Assembly of the Province of Manitoba, Canada.

This election pitted the province's coalition government, made up of the Liberal-Progressive Party and the Progressive Conservative Party, against a variety of opponents.

The social democratic Manitoba Co-operative Commonwealth Federation (CCF) was the coalition's primary challenger, while the communist Labour Progressive Party and an assortment of independent candidates also challenged the coalition in some constituencies.

Liberal-Progressive and Progressive Conservative candidates ran against each other in some ridings, generally where no anti-coalition candidates had a serious chance of winning.

The result was a landslide victory for the coalition.  Premier Douglas Campbell's Liberal-Progressives remained the dominant party in government, increasing their caucus to thirty-one seats out of fifty-seven—enough to form a majority government even without assistance from other parties.  One of these candidates was elected simply as a "Liberal", but sat as a full member of the Liberal-Progressive caucus.

The Progressive Conservative Party, led by Errick Willis, remained the junior partner in government, falling to nine seats from thirteen in the previous election.  Five independent "Conservative" or "Progressive Conservative" candidates were also elected, with all but one opposing the coalition government.  These results provoked serious debate in the Progressive Conservative Party about the wisdom of staying with the coalition.

The CCF under Edwin Hansford fell to seven seats, down from nine in the previous election.  Bill Kardash of the LPP retained his seat in north-end Winnipeg.  Three pro-coalition independents were also elected, as was Edmond Prefontaine, an independent Liberal opposing the coalition.

The Social Credit League did not contest the election, having fallen into a state of internal disorganization.

Winnipeg had 12 seats filled through Single Transferable Voting, St. Boniface had two seats filled through STV, and the other districts elected one MLA each through Alternative Voting, where a candidate had to have majority of the votes to be elected. In Iberville, Morris and Rhineland, where no candidate had the majority in the First Count, only the First Count totals are shown - the final vote count and the intermediate counts are not. In all three cases, the leader in the first count was elected. Instant runoff voting thus made no change to who would have been elected versus who would have been elected under First  past the post.

Results

Results by riding
Bold names indicate members returned by acclamation. Italicized names indicate Anti-Coalition candidates returned. Incumbents are marked with *.

Multi-member constituencies

St. Boniface

Winnipeg Centre
Four to be elected.

Winnipeg North

Winnipeg South
4 to be elected. Quota was 5522.

Post-election changes

On August 15, 1950, Progressive Conservative leader Errick Willis resigned his seat in cabinet.  The party formally left the coalition later in the summer, and John McDowell, Hugh Morrison and Dufferin Roblin joined the party caucus.

Some Progressive Conservative MLAs opposed their party's decision, and chose to remain with the coalition side.  Charles Greenlay and Wallace Miller chose to remain in cabinet, while James Argue and Joseph Donaldson sat as pro-coalition independents.  Argue rejoined the Progressive Conservatives in 1953, while Donaldson resigned his seat.  Thomas Seens did not initially support the party's decision to leave the coalition, but sat with the Progressive Conservatives in the legislature.

Ronald Robertson and Edmond Prefontaine rejoined the Liberal-Progressives, while independents Rod Clement and Walter Weir also remained on the government side.  Harry Shewman appears to have sided with the opposition.

St. Andrews (dec. James McLenaghen, June 23, 1950), October 24, 1950:
Thomas P. Hillhouse (LP) 2366
William Earl Gordon (CCF) 1513
Veitch (PC) 1187

St. Clements (dec. Nicholas Stryk, 1950), October 24, 1950:
Albert Trapp (LP) 2729
Wasylyk (CCF) 560
Andrew Bileski (LPP) 254

Brandon City (res. Joseph Donaldson, April 18, 1951), January 21, 1952:
Reginald Lissaman (PC) 3223
Alex McPhail (LP) 2233
Spafford (CCF) 1305

La Verendrye (dec. Sauveur Marcoux, November 16, 1951), January 21, 1952:
Edmond Brodeur (LP) 2334
Arpin (PC) 1363

Winnipeg South (res. Charles Rhodes Smith, 1952)

St. Clements (dec. Albert Trapp, January 9, 1953)

Cypress (dec. James Christie, January 19, 1953)

Virden (dec. Robert Mooney, January 30, 1953)

Ste. Rose (dec. Maurice MacCarthy, June 8, 1953)

Further reading
 

1949 elections in Canada
1949
1949 in Manitoba
November 1949 events in Canada